The Weiwang 205 is a Microvan produced by Weiwang, a sub-brand of BAIC. Beijing Automotive Industry Corporation, BAIC, launched the Weiwang brand in March 2011 and will focus on minicars and minivans.

Overview

The Weiwang 205 is based on the same platform as the first product at the brand launch, the 306, and it is a typical Chinese minivan or mianbaoche. Launched in November 2012, the available engines include a 1.0L inline-four producing 61hp and 87nm of torque and a 1.3L inline-four producing 81hp and 102nm of torque with both engines mated to a 5-speed manual gearbox. The price range starts from 29,800 yuan to 40,800 yuan.

References

External links

Official website

vans
Microvans
BAIC Group vehicles
Cars of China
Cars introduced in 2012